The Permanent Representative of Maldives to the United Nations  is the leader of the Maldives' diplomatic mission to the United Nations. It is customary that the Permanent Representative also be dually accredited as Ambassador to the United States of America. Since May 2019, the incumbent is Thilmeeza Hussain, the first woman to hold the post.

List of Permanent Representatives
H.E. Mr. Ahmed Hilmy Didi (1965–1966)
H.E. Mr. Abdul Sattar Moosa Didi (1967–1970)
H.E. Mr. Maumoon Abdul Gayoom (1976–1977)
H.E. Mr. Fathulla Jameel (1977–1978)
H.E. Mr. Ahmed Zaki (1979–1983)
H.E. Mr. Mohamed Musthafa Hussain (1984–1987)
H.E. Mr. Hussain Manikfan (1988–1991)
H.E. Mr. Ahmed Zaki (1993–1996)
H.E. Mr. Hussain Shihab (1998–2002)
H.E. Dr. Mohamed Latheef (2002–2007)
H.E. Mr. Ahmed Khaleel (2007–2008)
H.E. Mr. Abdul Ghafoor Mohamed (2009–2012)
H.E. Mr. Ahmed Sareer (2012–2017)
H.E. Dr. Ali Naseer Mohamed (2017–2019)
H.E. Ms. Thilmeeza Hussain (2019–present)

See also 
 Chief of Protocol

Notes

References

Further reading
 

Lists of Permanent Representatives to the United Nations
Foreign relations of the Maldives
Lists of ambassadors of the Maldives